This is a chronological list of all ships launched in 1752.



See also 

1752
Ship launches